John Malcolm Macgregor CVO (born 3 October 1946) is a retired British diplomat who was ambassador to Poland and Austria.

Career
John Malcolm Macgregor was educated at Kibworth Beauchamp Grammar School (now Beauchamp College) and Balliol College, Oxford (where he was organ scholar), then obtained a Certificate in Education at Birmingham University. He taught at Cranleigh School 1969–73, then joined the Diplomatic Service. Between posts at the Foreign and Commonwealth Office he served in New Delhi, Prague, Paris and Düsseldorf before being appointed ambassador to Poland 1998–2000 and to Austria 2003–07. He then retired from the Diplomatic Service and was dean of the University of Kent at Brussels 2007–09. Subsequently, he was a governor of Chichester University, and visiting professor at Instituto Tecnológico Autónomo de México and at Canterbury Christ Church University.

Family
John Malcolm Macgregor is married to Judith Macgregor (née Brown), also a British ambassador. They have three sons and a daughter.

References

Sources
MACGREGOR, John Malcolm, Who's Who 2013, A & C Black, 2013; online edn, Oxford University Press, December 2012.

1946 births
Living people
Alumni of Balliol College, Oxford
Ambassadors of the United Kingdom to Poland
Ambassadors of the United Kingdom to Austria
Commanders of the Royal Victorian Order